Yves Lorion (born 19 July 1901, date of death unknown) was a French sailor. He competed in the Star event at the 1948 Summer Olympics.

References

External links
 

1901 births
Year of death missing
French male sailors (sport)
Olympic sailors of France
Sailors at the 1948 Summer Olympics – Star
Place of birth missing